The 1972 Fresno State Bulldogs football team represented California State University, Fresno as a member of the Pacific Coast Athletic Association (PCAA) during the 1972 NCAA University Division football season. Led by Darryl Rogers in his seventh and final season as head coach, the Fresno State compiled an overall record of 6–4–1 with a mark of 1–3 in conference play, tying for third place in the PCAA. The Bulldogs played their home games at Ratcliffe Stadium on the campus of Fresno City College in Fresno, California.

Schedule

Team players in the NFL
The following were selected in the 1973 NFL Draft.

References

Fresno State
Fresno State Bulldogs football seasons
Fresno State Bulldogs football